Henry Withy (11 November 1852 – 31 May 1922) was born in Bristol, England on 11 November 1852. His parents were Edward Withy (Woollen Draper and Tailor) and Sarah Withy (née Atree).

Early life
In his early childhood, he attended Brean Villa (Quaker) Preparatory School, Camden Terrace, Weston Super Mare, in Somerset. At the age of 10, he went to Friends' School, Sidcot, from 1862 to 1867. He served as an apprentice at Withy, Alexander & Co. in West Hartlepool for 5 years, between 1869 and 1874.

Ship-building
His first connection with business was in a large hardware establishment in the City of Bristol but he did not remain there long. He started business at the beginning of 1868, and twelve months later saw him moving to Hartlepool, where he went into the yard of Withy, Alexander and Co. where his elder brother, Edward Withy was a partner. Here, he worked as an apprentice for five years, whilst picking up the rudiments of the knowledge of shipbuilding. In the 19th century, the Clyde was in the hey-day of its fame as a shipbuilding centre and it was there that he went, to improve his knowledge of the profession of shipbuilding. In 1873, Henry Withy proceeded to Govan, to the historic shipyard of Robert Napier and Sons, afterwards putting in some time with the Fairfield Shipbuilding and Engineering Company. In all, Henry Withy spent three years on Clyde side, and then returned to his brother's yard at Hartlepool. Before finally settling down in earnest, he decided to see something of the world and took an extended trip to South America.

Upon his return home, in 1876, Henry assisted his brother Edward in the management of the business of Edward Withy and Co. for about two years, after which Henry assumed the sole responsibility for managing the works, after his brother decided to retire from the firm and move to New Zealand. In 1891, the Furness Line Company of Christopher Furness and Edward Withy and Co. were merged in Hartlepool. to form the Company of Furness Withy.

Henry Withy's theoretical and practical knowledge of electricity enabled him to exploit the practicability of using it as a motive power, and utilising it for motor purposes, as well as for lighting the works. The result was that all of the machines in the extensive establishment of Furness, Withy and Co., Limited were worked by electricity, and as an indication of the progressive character of the firm and Henry in particular, that Furness, Withy and Co. was, at the time, the only shipyard in the United Kingdom to be driven throughout by electric power. Other areas of innovation, where Furness, Withy and Co. took the lead, include building of the first triple steamship in the port, and with the first use of telephone communication. Furness, Withy and Co. was also renowned, as a company, for the quality and quantity of work turned out.

Specific statistics of note are that in 1869, the average tonnage of the vessels they built was 436 tons; in 1879, it was 1,145 tons; while in 1899 it had increased to 5,442 tons. The shipyard was, in 1900, equipped for dealing with vessels of up to 600 ft (180 m) in length, and has turned out numerous fine passenger and cargo boats. The yard also possessed a graving dock, capable of taking in steamers up to 7,000 tons deadweight, where many extensive jobs were undertaken.

Private life
In his private life, Henry Withy was, besides being a director of Furness, Withy and Co., Ship-owners and Shipbuilders; a Justice of the Peace (JP) and Town Councillor for the Borough of Hartlepool; member of the Board of Guardians; member of the Port Sanitary Authority; member of Lloyd's Technical Sub-Committee; member of the Institute of Naval Architects; of the Steel and Iron Institute; of the Institution of Mechanical Engineers (5 August 1884, proposed by his brother Edward Withy); of the Institute of Civil Engineers (6 December 1904) and of the North-East Coast Institution of Engineers and Shipbuilders (past President, 1900-1901). He was also Mayor of Hartlepool in 1889-90.

In 1902, he presented an ornamental drinking fountain that originally stood in the Burn Valley Gardens but was moved to Clarence Road, Hartlepool in 1979.

References

British marine engineers
People from Hartlepool
1852 births
1922 deaths